Dean Gal is an Israeli footballer who plays for Hapoel Kafr Kanna.

Honours
Liga Leumit
Winner (1): 2016-17

References

1995 births
Living people
Israeli Jews
Israeli footballers
Maccabi Netanya F.C. players
Ironi Nesher F.C. players
Hapoel Bik'at HaYarden F.C. players
Hapoel Ashdod F.C. players
Maccabi Sha'arayim F.C. players
Hapoel Kafr Kanna F.C. players
Israeli Premier League players
Liga Leumit players
Footballers from Netanya
Association football goalkeepers